I Predict a Riot is the second studio album by American hip hop musician Hezekiah. It was released on Rawkus Records and Soulspazm Records on September 18, 2007. It features guest appearances from Freeway, Bilal, and Jaguar Wright.

Critical reception

Marisa Brown of AllMusic said, "[Hezekiah's] rhymes and beats are more focused, clearer, and more intelligent than a lot of what else is out there, and he writes well-done, backpacker-friendly songs that are also catchy and memorable." James Mayo of XLR8R described the album as "a record of timeless soul-infused hip-hop." Kevin Jones of Exclaim! commented that "While his flow may feel a little loose at times, Hezekiah surrounds himself with enough vocal heat (Freeway, most notably) to pad out this well-rounded collection of neo-soul survivalist hip-hop." Roman Cooper of HipHopDX stated, "He possesses a rare combination of lyricism, charisma and passion on the mic, backed by an equally impressive musical backdrop."

PopMatters placed it at number 81 on the "101 Hip-Hop Albums of 2007" list.

Track listing

References

External links
 

2007 albums
Rawkus Records albums
Hip hop albums by American artists